Olga Alexandrovna Slavnikova (born 23 October 1957) is a Russian novelist and literary critic. She was awarded the 2006 Russian Booker Prize for her novel 2017.

Biography
Olga Slavnikova was born and grew up in Yekaterinburg. She graduated from the Faculty of Journalism at the Ural State University in 1981. Her first works of fiction were published in the late 1980s. She has lived and worked in Moscow since 2001.

She began publishing novels in the 1990s, several of which won awards, including the Apollon Grigoriev Prize, the Polonsky Prize, and the Bazhov Prize. She was awarded the 2006 Russian Booker Prize for her novel 2017. Her latest novel Lightheaded was published in 2010.

She also writes about contemporary literature and serves as director of the Debut Independent Literary Prize, which receives up to 50,000 entries per year. The prize was founded by the private organization Pokolenie to help young Russian authors get their works published in Russia and in translations worldwide. Olga has been the director of the Debut Prize since 2001.

Works

English translations
2017: A Novel, Overlook, 2010. . Translated by Marian Schwartz.
 Light-headed, Dedalus, 2015. . Translated by Andrew Bromfield.
 The man who couldn't die : the tale of an authentic human being, Columbia University Press, 2019 (The Russian Library). . Translated by Marian Schwartz.

References

Living people
1957 births
Russian women novelists
Russian literary critics
Russian women critics
Women literary critics
Writers from Yekaterinburg
Russian Booker Prize winners
Pavel Bazhov Prize recipients
Ural State University alumni